Miroslav Leitner (born August 1, 1966) is a Slovakian ski mountaineer and has been member of the SSA national squad since 1992. Until the split of Czechoslovakia in 1993, he ran for the Czechoslovac team.

Leitner was born in Brezno. He started ski mountaineering in 1983 and competed first in the same year.

Selected results 
 1998:
 4th, Patrouille des Glaciers  ("seniors I" ranking), together with Milan Madaj and Dušan Trizna
 2001:
 3rd, European Championship team race (together with Peter Svätojánsky)
 2002:
 3rd, World Championship team race (together with Peter Svätojánsky)
 2004:
 5th, World Championship relay race (together with Peter Svätojánsky, Branislav Kačina and Milan Madaj
 7th, World Championship team race (together with Peter Svätojánsky)
 9th, World Championship combination ranking
 2005:
 5th, European Championship relay race (together with Milan Madaj, Peter Svätojánsky and Branislav Kačina)
 8th, European Championship team race (together with Peter Svätojánsky)
 2006:
 4th, World Championship relay race (together with Peter Svätojánsky, Milan Blaško and Milan Madaj)
 2008:
 5th, World Championship relay race (together with Peter Svätojánsky, Jozef Hlavco and Juraj Laštík)

Pierra Menta 

 1992: 9th, together with Tibor Novajovský
 1993: 3rd, together with Dušan Trizna
 1994: 10th, together with Jean-Bastipte Mang
 1996: 5th, together with Peter Matos
 1997: 9th, together with Peter Matos
 1998: 9th, together with Adriano Greco
 2000: 4th, together with Peter Svätojánsky
 2001: 4th, together with Peter Svätojánsky
 2002: 8th, together with Peter Svätojánsky
 2005: 9th, together with Peter Svätojánsky

Trofeo Mezzalama 

 2003: 10th, together with Peter Svätojánsky and Milan Madaj

External links 
 Miroslav Leitner at SkiMountaineering.org

1966 births
Living people
Sportspeople from Brezno
Slovak people of German descent
Slovak male ski mountaineers
Czechoslovak male ski mountaineers